The Galleria d'arte moderna Aroldo Bonzagni is an Italian museum, located in Cento. It was founded in 1959 in memory of the local painter Aroldo Bonzagni, who died in 1918 at only thirty years of age.

Collection 
The museum collection is focused on a group of paintings by Bonzagni and a selection of works of Italian figurative painters of the twentieth century.

Among the many artists represented are Aldo Carpi, Achille Funi, Raffaele De Grada, Filippo De Pisis, Lucio Fontana, Umberto Lilloni, Giò Pomodoro, Aligi Sassu, Pio Semeghini, Mario Sironi, Adriano Spilimbergo, Guido Tallone, Renato Vernizzi, and Adolfo Wildt.

References 

Art museums and galleries in Emilia-Romagna
Cento
Contemporary art galleries in Italy
Modern art museums in Italy
Local museums in Italy